Code Red is the ninth studio album by German thrash metal band Sodom, released on 31 May 1999 via Drakkar Entertainment. On this album, Sodom returned to classic thrash metal which pleased many fans. It was also released as a two-disc limited edition with a Sodom tribute album called Homage to the Gods and as a two-disc edition with an Onkel Tom Angelripper's album called Ich glaub' nicht an den Weihnachtsmann.

Track listing

The intro sample is taken from the film Full Metal Jacket.

Personnel
Sodom
 Tom Angelripper – vocals, bass
 Bernd "Bernemann" Kost – guitars
 Bobby Schottkowski – drums

Production
Axel Hermann – cover art
Harris Johns – producer, mixing, recording

References 

Sodom (band) albums
1999 albums
Albums produced by Harris Johns